Chelasban (also Romanized as Chelasbān and Chalasbān; also known as Chillis Pān) is a village in Alvir Rural District, Kharqan District, Zarandieh County, Markazi Province, Iran. At the 2006 census, its population was 557, in 169 families.

References 

Populated places in Zarandieh County